Eubulus le Strange, 1st Baron Strange (died 1335) was an English baron and an especially competent and trusted military officer for King Edward III.

He married Alice de Lacy, Countess of Lincoln (1281–1348) as her second husband in 1324, and has been incongruously considered as her lover during her unhappy and childless first marriage (1294–1322, divorced 1318 after an abduction 1317) to her royal first husband, Thomas, 2nd Earl of Lancaster (executed 1322). They had no children.

He died while on campaign in the Second War of Scottish Independence (1332–1357) on 8 September 1335. His nephew, Roger le Strange, 4th Baron Strange of Knockyn, aged forty years and more, was his heir.

References

Year of birth missing
1335 deaths
14th-century English nobility
English people of the Wars of Scottish Independence
Barons Strange
Le Strange family